Les Ollières-sur-Eyrieux (literally Les Ollières on Eyrieux) is a commune in the Ardèche department in southern France.

The nearest towns are Privas and Saint-Sauveur-de-Montagut.

History
The first records of a settlement can be dated back to the 12th century. Situated on the banks of the river Eyrieux (a tributary to the Rhône), Les Ollières (as it is often shortened to by the local people) became a central location for the treatment and processing of silk in the early 18th century. The silk (and later different textiles) industry was to feature heavily in the surrounding area.

21st century
The village has now become a tourist location, attracting many Dutch, German, Swiss and English tourists to its many camp sites during the summer months. Some tourists have started to renovate old cottages and set up permanent or holiday homes in the area.

Population

Transportation
For the people of Les Ollières a daily bus service runs to Valence and Privas.

See also
Communes of the Ardèche department

References

Communes of Ardèche
Ardèche communes articles needing translation from French Wikipedia